The 2012–13 Air21 Express season was the second season of the franchise in the Philippine Basketball Association (PBA).

Key dates
August 19: The 2012 PBA Draft took place in Robinson's Midtown Mall, Manila.

Draft picks

Roster

Philippine Cup

Eliminations

Standings

Game log

|- bgcolor="#edbebf" 
| 1
| October 3
|  Barako Bull
|  87–90
|  Baclao (18)
|  Sena (6)
|  Wilson, Arboleda (4)
|  Smart Araneta Coliseum
|  0–1
|  Boxscore
|- bgcolor="#bbffbb" 
| 2
|  October 7
|  GlobalPort
|  88–81
|  Wilson (17)
|  Taha (12)
|  Wilson (4)
|  Smart Araneta Coliseum
|  1–1
|  Boxscore
|- bgcolor="#edbebf" 
| 3
|  October 12
|  Rain or Shine
|  98–99*
|  Wilson (21)
|  Isip (10)
|  Wilson (4)
|  Smart Araneta Coliseum
|  1–2
|  Boxscore
|- bgcolor="#edbebf" 
| 4
|  October 17
|  Talk 'N Text
|  89–96
|  Canaleta (21)
|  Wilson, Isip (7)
|  Arboleda (4)
|  Mall of Asia Arena
|  1–3
|  Boxscore
|- bgcolor="#edbebf" 
| 5
|  October 21
|  Meralco
|  72–85
|  Wilson (16)
|  Taha (9)
|  Arboleda (5)
|  Mall of Asia Arena
|  1–4
|  Boxscore
|- bgcolor="#edbebf" 
| 6
|  October 26
|  Alaska
|  81–92
|  Custodio (20)
|  Arboleda, Taha, Wilson (7)
|  Arboleda (5)
|  Smart Araneta Coliseum
|  1–5
|  Boxscore

|- bgcolor="#bbffbb" 
| 7
|  November 2
|  Petron Blaze
|  97–76
|  Isip (22)
|  Canaleta (10)
|  Atkins (7)
|  Smart Araneta Coliseum
|  2–5
|  Boxscore
|- bgcolor="#bbffbb" 
| 8
|  November 9
|  Barako Bull
|  86–85
|  Cortez (24)
|  Canaleta (8)
|  Cortez (6)
|  Cuneta Astrodome
|  3–5
|  Boxscore
|- bgcolor="#bbffbb" 
| 9
|  November 14
|  Alaska
|  104–103
|  Canaleta (21)
|  Reyes (8)
|  Cortez (11)
|  Smart Araneta Coliseum
| 4–5
|  Boxscore
|- bgcolor="#edbebf" 
| 10
|  November 17
|  Rain or Shine
|  62–71
|  Canaleta (18)
|  Canaleta (12)
|  Baclao (4)
|  Tubod, Lanao del Norte
|  4–6
|  Boxscore
|- bgcolor="#edbebf" 
| 11
|  November 23
|  San Mig Coffee
|  80–89
|  Canaleta (18)
|  Canaleta (6)
|  Cortez (8)
|  Smart Araneta Coliseum
|  4–7
|  Boxscore
|- bgcolor="#edbebf" 
| 12
|  November 25
|  Talk 'N Text
|  94–100
|  Cortez (23)
|   Cortez (9)
|  Custodio (5)
|  Smart Araneta Coliseum
|  4–8
|  Boxscore
|- bgcolor="#edbebf" 
| 13
|  November 30
|  Barangay Ginebra
|  76–99
|  Arboleda (17)
|  Reyes (9)
|  Arboleda, Atkins (2)
|  Smart Araneta Coliseum
|  4–9
|  Boxscore

|- bgcolor="#bbffbb" 
| 14
|  December 5
|  GlobalPort
|  113–92
|  Canaleta (41)
|  Reyes (16)
|  Cortez (6)
|  Smart Araneta Coliseum
|  5–9
|  Boxscore

Playoffs

Bracket

Game log

|- bgcolor="#edbebf" 
| 1
|  December 13
|  Talk 'N Text
|  100–105
|  Canaleta (25)
|  Cortez, Isip (9)
|  Cortez (18)
|  Smart Araneta Coliseum
|  0–1
|  Boxscore

Commissioner's Cup

Eliminations

Standings

Game log

|- bgcolor="#bbffbb" 
| 1
|  February 10
|  Barangay Ginebra
|  74–70
|  Dunigan (26)
|  Dunigan (19)
|  Custodio (5)
|  Smart Araneta Coliseum
|  1–0
|  boxscore
|- bgcolor="#edbebf" 
| 2
|  February 15
|  Talk 'N Text
|  83–86
|  Canaleta (23)
|  Dunigan (7)
|  Cortez (5)
|  Smart Araneta Coliseum
|  1–1
|  boxscore
|- bgcolor="#edbebf" 
| 3
|  February 22
|  Barako Bull
|  86–91
|  Dunigan (30)
|  Dunigan (19)
|  Cortez (5)
|  Mall of Asia Arena
|  1–2
|  boxscore
|- bgcolor="#edbebf" 
| 4
|  February 27
|  Rain or Shine
|  97–99
|  Dunigan (22)
|  Dunigan (10)
|  Dunigan, Cortez (5)
|  Smart Araneta Coliseum
|  1–3
|  boxscore

|- bgcolor="#edbebf" 
| 5
|  March 1
|  Petron Blaze
|  53–60
|  Dunigan (15)
|  Dunigan (23)
|  Cortez (3)
|  Smart Araneta Coliseum
|  1–4
|  boxscore
|- bgcolor="#edbebf" 
| 6
|  March 6
|  Meralco
|  88–89
|  Dunigan (40)
|  Dunigan (16)
|  Cortez (7)
|  Smart Araneta Coliseum
|  1–5
|  boxscore
|- bgcolor="#bbffbb" 
| 7
|  March 10
|  GlobalPort
|  106–94
|  Dunigan (35)
|  Dunigan (20)
|  Cortez, Arboleda (5)
|  Smart Araneta Coliseum
|  2–5
|  boxscore
|- bgcolor="#bbffbb"
| 8
|  March 15
|  Alaska
|  74–68
|  Dunigan (25)
|  Dunigan (14)
|  Cortez (5)
|  Ynares Center
|  3–5
|  Boxscore
|- bgcolor="#bbffbb"
| 9
|  March 20
|  San Mig Coffee
|  87–82
|  Dunigan (25)
|  Dunigan (20)
|  Cortez (6)
|  Cuneta Astrodome
|  4–5
|  Boxscore
|- bgcolor="#bbffbb"
| 10
|  March 23
|  GlobalPort
| 87–82
|  Dunigan (22)
|  Dunigan (15)
|  Dunigan (8)
|  Smart Araneta Coliseum
|  5–5
|  boxscore
|- bgcolor="#edbebf"
| 11
|  March 31
|  Rain or Shine
| 83–94
|  Dunigan (34)
|  Dunigan (15)
|  Dunigan (6)
|  Mall of Asia Arena
|  5–6
|  Boxscore

|- bgcolor="#edbebf"
| 12
|  April 3
|  Barangay Ginebra
|  84–90
|  Canaleta (29)
|  Dunigan (8)
|  Custodio (4)
|  Smart Araneta Coliseum
|  5–7
|  Boxscore
|- bgcolor="#edbebf"
| 13
|  April 10
|  San Mig Coffee
|  66–80
|  Canaleta (26)
|  Dunigan (17)
|  Custodio (3)
|  Smart Araneta Coliseum
|  5–8
|  Boxscore
|- bgcolor="#bbffbb"
| 14
|  April 13
|  Petron Blaze
|  95–91
|  Canaleta (37)
|  Dunigan (17)
|  Dunigan (6)
|  Mall of Asia Arena
|  6–8
|  Boxscore

Playoffs

Bracket

Game log

|- bgcolor="#edbebf" 
| 1
|  December 13
|  Alaska
|  100–105
|  Canaleta (16)
|  Dunigan (11)
|  Dunigan (7)
|  Mall of Asia Arena
|  0–1
|  Boxscore

Governors' Cup

Eliminations

Standings

Game log

|- bgcolor= 
| 1
|  August 14
|  GlobalPort
|  
|  
|  
|  
|  Mall of Asia Arena
| 
|  
|- bgcolor= 
| 2
|  August 17
|  San Mig Coffee
|  
|  
|  
|  
|  Ynares Center
| 
|  
|- bgcolor= 
| 3
|  August 25
|  Barako Bull
|  
|  
|  
|  
|  Mall of Asia Arena
| 
|  
|- bgcolor= 
| 4
|  August 28
|  Petron Blaze
|  
|  
|  
|  
|  Mall of Asia Arena
| 
|  
|- bgcolor= 
| 5
|  August 31
|  Rain or Shine
|  
|  
|  
|  
|  Mall of Asia Arena
| 
|

Transactions

Trades

Pre-season

Philippine Cup

Commissioner's Cup

Governors' Cup

Recruited imports

References

Air21
Air21 Express seasons